Sepioloidea is a genus of cephalopod comprising three species.

Species
 Genus Sepioloidea
 Sepioloidea lineolata (Quoy & Gaimard, 1832), Striped Pyjama Squid
 Sepioloidea magna Reid, 2009 
 Sepioloidea pacifica (Kirk, 1882), Pacific Bobtail Squid

References

External links

Cuttlefish
Cephalopod genera